Pierre Jean Paul Voizard (22 August 1896, Lucey, Meurthe-et-Moselle – 26 December 1982) was a Minister of State for Monaco. He served between 1950 and 1953.

He subsequently served as Resident General of France in the French Protectorate of Tunisia from 1953–1954.

References

1896 births
1982 deaths
People from Meurthe-et-Moselle
Ministers of State of Monaco
French residents-general in Tunisia